Pobedinka is an urban locality (an urban-type settlement) in Skopinsky District of Ryazan Oblast, Russia. Population:

References

Urban-type settlements in Ryazan Oblast